Disney's Caribbean Beach Resort is a resort located within the Walt Disney World Resort. It is located in the Epcot Resort Area of Walt Disney World, close to the waterpark Typhoon Lagoon and is classified as a moderately priced resort. The resort started operating on October 1, 1988 and is owned and operated by Disney Parks, Experiences and Products.

Resort description
The Caribbean Beach Resort is designed with a Caribbean theme. Guests stay in one of the small buildings that encircle Barefoot Bay, a  lake. Buildings are grouped into one of five villages, with shared resources, each named after an island in the Caribbean: Martinique, Barbados, Jamaica, Aruba, and Trinidad. There is also a bus that travels throughout the entire resort to get from each village to the next.  Each village has its own swimming pool and some also have their own playgrounds.

Resort facilities are located at Old Port Royale Centertown, a building that contains a restaurant, a food court, arcade, and two gift shops.

The shores of the bay feature beaches, hammocks, and other activities such as beach volleyball. The resort also features various water sports at the Marina, where resort guests can rent various watercraft, such as paddle boats and speed boats by the half-hour.

Guest rooms
Guest rooms are decorated in a Caribbean style with pastel tones and each island village has slightly different themes. In 2009, Disney began work redesigning some rooms to a Finding Nemo theme. In January 2009, Disney refurbished many rooms in the Trinidad South village with a pirate theme.

Dining

Caribbean Beach Resort offers a variety of dining options including sit-down restaurants, lounges and bars, and quick service restaurants. 
Sebastian's Bistro- Caribbean Beach's full-service restaurant, serving American cuisine with Caribbean influences.
Centertown Market- Caribbean Beach's quick service restaurant, located at Old Port Royale
Banana Cabana - pool bar located at Old Port Royale which serves snacks and drinks poolside.
Spyglass Grill- located by Trinidad's pool serves American food with a Caribbean twist.

Recreation
Pools - Six heated pools are located throughout the island villages. The Old Port Royale pool features waterfalls, water slides, and shooting cannons and is the resort's feature pool.
Beaches - Several beaches are located around the resort for relaxation and for children to play in the sand.

Caribbean Cay - a full acre playground located in the middle of Barefoot Bay with tropical birds.
Playgrounds - the playground is located on the middle Island of Caribbean Cay.
Marina - watercraft rentals such as pontoon boats are available on Barefoot Bay but currently closed due to social distancing protocols.
Jogging Trail - a 1.2-mile trail is located around Barefoot Bay.
Volleyball Courts - volleyball courts are located on Martinique beach.
Bike Rentals - bike and surrey rentals are available for rent along the island promenade but currently unavailable due to enhanced cleaning protocols.

Renovations
In January 2017, plans were filed for resort renovations. The next Disney Vacation Club resort, Disney's Riviera Resort,  will be built on the now demolished Barbados and Martinique sections of the resort and will not be a part of the Caribbean Beach Resort.

The Caribbean Beach Resort is one of the stops on the Disney Skyliner gondola transit system, which connects Epcot and Disney's Hollywood Studios.

References

External links

Disney's Caribbean Beach Resort at the Better Business Bureau of Central Florida

 Hotels established in 1988
Caribbean Beach Resort
 Hotel buildings completed in 1988
1988 establishments in Florida